P. J. Brooke is the pseudonym of a married couple, Philip James O'Brien and Jane Brooke, who have written three contemporary crime thrillers set in Granada, Spain, featuring sub-Inspector Max Romero. They have both written non-fiction under their own names.

Writing fiction
Philip O'Brien started writing fiction after the death of his first wife. Jane Brooke got involved, commenting on exercises prepared for his creative writing class at Glasgow University, and then taking a more active role. Blood Wedding, their first novel, was published in 2008 by Constable & Robinson in UK and by Soho Press in the US, and a second novel, A Darker Night, ensued in 2010.

Published works

Fiction (as P. J. Brooke)
P. J. Brooke. Blood Wedding, London: Constable & Robinson; New York: Soho Constable, 2008. 
P. J. Brooke. A Darker Night, London: Constable & Robinson; New York: Soho Constable, 2010. 
P. J. Brooke. Death's Other Kingdom,  New York: Little, Brown and Company, 2011.

Non-fiction by Philip O'Brien
Philip O'Brien, ed. Allende's Chile, New York: Praeger Publishing, 1976. .
I. Roxborough, P. O'Brien and J. Roddick. Chile: State and Revolution,  London: Macmillan Publishers, 1976: New York: Holmes and Meier, 1977
P. O'Brien and J. Roddick. Chile: The Pinochet Decade: The Rise and Fall of the Chicago Boys,  London: Latin American Bureau, 1983. .
Philip O'Brien and Paul Cammack, eds. Generals in Retreat: The Crisis of Military Rule in Latin America, Manchester: Manchester University Press, 1985

Non-fiction by Jane Brooke
M. Bhatti, J. Brooke and M. Gibson, eds. Housing and the Environment: The New Agenda, Coventry: Chartered Institute of Housing, 1992

Personal life
O'Brien and Brooke, who are married to each other, live in the Albaicín in Granada, Spain and also in Glasgow, Scotland. O'Brien is Scottish; Brooke was born in Leigh-on-Sea, Essex, England and was brought up in Yorkshire.

References

External links

Constable & Robinson
Soho Press

1943 births
1951 births
Living people
Alumni of the University of St Andrews
British crime fiction writers
British mystery writers
Granada
Married couples
People associated with Glasgow
People from Leigh-on-Sea
People from Normanton, West Yorkshire
Writing duos